Polyamblyodon gibbosum (Cristie) is a species of marine fish in the Seabream family (family Sparidae) of order Perciformes. It is native to the east coast of Southern Africa.

Description
Robust, moderately deep body with a steep forehead and slightly protruding snout. Strongly defined lateral line and long pectoral fins.

The colour is an overall blue-grey, with dusky to pale yellow fins.

Attains 60 cm. Common length 35 cm.

Diagnostics
The dorsal fin has 11 spines, followed by 12 rays. The anal fin has 3 spines and 11 rays. There are 16 to 19 gill rakers on the first gill arch. The lateral line has 77 to 78 scales. There are 2.5 times the body depth in the standard length.

Taxonomy

Synonyms
 Pachymetopon gibbosus Pellegrin, 1914
 Polyamblyodon cristiceps Smith, 1940

Common names
 Cristie 
 Knife-back Seabream

Etymology
Latin gibbosum = humped

Distribution and habitat
Known only from KwaZulu-Natal to central Mozambique and Madagascar. Common on Aliwal shoal and Sodwana reefs. Offshore coral and rocky reefs from shallow to 30m, but not in the surf zone. Forms loose feeding shoals over reefs.
Little is known about the biology and population status. The species is not targeted to any great extent, and it is found in MPAs.

Diet
Feeds on zooplankton.

Reproduction

References

Sparidae
Fish described in 1914